"You're Never Fully Dressed Without a Smile" is a song from the Broadway musical Annie, written by Charles Strouse and Martin Charnin.

Sia cover 

Sia covered the song for the soundtrack for the 2014 film. The single charted in Australia, Belgium, UK and in Poland where it became an airplay hit—the song peaked at number 3 on the Polish Airplay Top 20 Chart and at number 2 on the Polish TV Airplay Chart.

Music video 
The video for this song was filmed in New York City, USA. It features the cast from the actual film as they spread cheer to the citizens of the city by dancing, performing random acts of kindness and holding signs with the word "smile" written on them.

Charts

Release history

References

External links
 

Songs from musicals
2014 singles
1977 songs
Songs with music by Charles Strouse
Columbia Records singles
Sia (musician) songs
Songs with lyrics by Martin Charnin
Little Orphan Annie